Ngosini West is a settlement in Kenya's Eastern Province.

References 

Populated places in Eastern Province (Kenya)